This article contains information about the literary events and publications of 1645.

Events
December – William Cavendish, later Duke of Newcastle, marries Margaret Lucas, whom he has met while himself in exile in France.
unknown dates
With the London theatres closed by the Puritan regime during the English Civil War, closet drama grows in prominence. Henry Burkhead's Cola's Fury, or Lirenda's Misery is written in this genre and the sisters Jane Cavendish and Elizabeth Egerton probably complete their The Concealed Fansyes while besieged.

New books

Prose
Edward Herbert, 1st Baron Herbert of Cherbury
De Causis Errorum (On the Causes of Errors)
De Religione Laici (On the Religion of the Laity)
John Milton
Colasterion
Tetrachordon
Elizabeth Richardson, Baroness Cramond – A Lady's Legacy to her Daughters
Alexander Ross
Medicus Medicatus
The Philosophical Touchstone
Francisco Manuel de Melo – Guerra de Cataluña
Horacio Carochi – Arte de la lengua mexicana
Daniello Bartoli – L'huomo di lettere
Hermann Busenbaum – Medulla theologiae moralis

Drama
Luis Quiñones de Benavente – Jocoseria. Burlas veras, o reprensión moral y festiva de los desórdenes públicos
Molière – Le Médecin volant
Paul Scarron – Jodelet

Poetry
John Milton – Poems of Mr. John Milton, Both English and Latin, compos'd at several times (dated this year, published early 1646)
Sheikh Muhammad – Yoga-samgrama
Edmund Waller – Poems

Births
August 14 – Carlos de Sigüenza y Góngora, Mexican priest, poet, geographer, and historian (died 1700)
August 16 or 17 – Jean de La Bruyère, French essayist (died 1696)
Unknown date – Edmund Bohun, English historian, publicist and political writer (died 1699)

Deaths
April 17 – Daniel Featley, English Calvinist theologian (born 1582)
August 28 – Hugo Grotius, Dutch polymath (born 1583)
August 31 – Francesco Bracciolini, Italian poet (born 1566)
September 8 – Francisco de Quevedo, Spanish nobleman, politician and poet (born 1580)
Unknown dates 
Feng Menglong (馮夢龍), Chinese vernacular poet and author (born 1574)
William Lithgow, Scottish travel writer (born 1582)
John Paul Nazarius, Italian Dominican theologian (born 1556)

References

 
Years of the 17th century in literature